Ariane Daguin is a French born American business owner, author, culinary celebrity and educator. Born in Auch, in the Gascony region of France, she was the first child of parents Jocelyne and Michelin starred chef André Daguin. She is the co-founder, CEO and owner of the American gourmet meat distributor, D'Artagnan. She also co-founded the non-profit farm foundation All For One One For All Farm in 2021.

Biography 
Daguin was born on March 12, 1958, and grew up assisting her father with food preparation and gaining the skills and knowledge necessary to eventually launch D'Artagnan in America.

In 1978, she came to America to pursue an academic degree at Columbia University. While living in New York City and attending school, Daguin was working part time for a New York pâté producer. In 1985, Daguin was presented with an chance to market duck and duck foie gras from the Catskills area of New York, and she launched D'Artagnan. As the company grew, it also started marketing other poultry that held to a standard of no hormones, no cages, no stress.

In 1988, Daguin gave birth to her first and only child, her daughter, Alix Daguin.

Daguin has appeared on many television shows, podcasts and has been the subject of numerous articles. She appeared on several television shows, including on Anthony Bourdain's No Reservations for the 2017 "Holiday Special" Episode. Bourdain also named his only daughter after Daguin.

Early Professional Career 
Daguin started out supplying meat and poultry via D'Artagnan to chefs, such as Daniel Boulud,  David Burke, Patrick Clark (the first black chef to win a James Beard Award), and Jean-Louis Palladin.

The company was the first in America to distribute fresh foie gras. The company was one the first to commercialize organic chicken in the USA, even though the USDA hadn't yet defined organic.

Later Professional Career

D'Artagnan 
In August 2005, Daguin bought out her co-founder. The company then started growing rapidly, reaching record sales of $50 million in 2008 and then ballooning to $130 million in revenue in 2019.

Some of the major milestones included creating and introducing the Rohan duck breed in 2011, and opening an additional four warehouses and distribution centers.

The D'Artagnan Farms Foundation

All for One One for All Farm 

Founded in 2021 by Daguin and her daughter Alix, AOOA Farm is a non-profit foundation based in Goshen, NY, focusing on regenerative agriculture, silvopasture and agricultural and gastronomic education.

Awards and Honors 

 1994 - James Beard Foundation Award - “Who’s Who of Food and Beverage in America”
 2005 - Bon Appetit Magazine - "Lifetime Achievement Award"
 2006 - France - "Legion d'Honneur"
 2010 - L'Academie Culinaire de France - "Dame de l'Année"
 2014 - Fast Company - "Most Creative People in Business"
 2017 - La Renaissance Française - "La Médaille d’Or de La Renaissance Française"
 2018 - International Association of Culinary Professionals - "Trailblazer Award"
 2018 - Forbes - Small Giants Award

Professional and Charitable Organizations 

 Food Council Member - CityHarvest
 Awards Committee - James Beard Foundation 
 Board Member - French American Chamber of Commerce (FACC-NY)

Television Appearances 

 Charlie Rose - "Four restaurateurs chart the ascendancy of new French cuisine in the United States, namely in New York and Washington, and highlight the ongoing, ground-breaking career of chef Jean-Louis Palladin." 
 My Country, My Kitchen titled "Gascony with Ariane Daguin" on Food Network
 After Hours with Daniel Boulud
 Martha Stewart 
 No Reservations 
 Beat Bobby Flay (Guest Judge) (multiple appearances)
 "Cooking Live" with Sara Moulton

Published Works 
 D'Artagnan à New-York. Ariane Daguin. Editions Grasset 2010. 
 D'Artagnan's Glorious Game Cookbook. Pruess, Joanna; Ariane Daguin; George Faison; 1999.  Boston: Little, Brown. .

References 

Living people
1958 births
People from Auch
21st-century French businesspeople
20th-century French businesspeople
Foie gras
Women nonprofit executives
21st-century American businesswomen
21st-century American businesspeople
20th-century American businesswomen
20th-century American businesspeople